Lizette Carrión (born March 12, 1972) is an American actress, best known for her portrayal of PFC Esmeralda "Doublewide" Del Rio in the 2005 FX network television series Over There.

Early life and education
Carrión was born in New York City, New York, the youngest of four siblings. She holds a bachelor's degree in Government and Politics from St. John's University.

Career
Carrión has performed in many New York City theatre productions such as "Bed, Bawd and Beyond" and "Flores and Alice Underground" to name a few. Carrión has multiple guest credits to her name on shows such as NYPD Blue, Judging Amy, Chicago Hope and ER. She has recently wrapped up production on the movie "Shackles" which she co-stars in with D.L. Hughley and "Crazylove".

Filmography
 Medium (2007) as Cashier
 Dexter (2006) as Shanda
 Crazylove (2005) as Maria
 Shackles (2005) as Rosa
 Over There (2005) as Pfc. Esmeralda "Doublewide" Del Rio
 The Division (2002 & 2004)
 Strong Medicine (2003) as Sarita Ballard
 Reba (2003) as Halle
 The Practice (2002) as Christina Portes
 The Chronicle (2002) as Monica / "Savage Simian"
 FreakyLinks (2000) as Lan Williams
 Third Watch (1999) as Sylvia Enrique
 ER (1999) as Lizette
 Chicago Hope (1999) as I Dunno Girl
 Brooklyn South (1998) as Luce
 Fired Up (1997) as Pierced Girl
 Family Matters (1997) as High Bidder
 Sister, Sister (1996) as M'lissa

Further reading

External links

1972 births
American television actresses
Living people
St. John's University (New York City) alumni
21st-century American women